Edson Rodrigues (born March 13, 1967) is a former Brazilian football player. He has played for Nagoya Grampus Eight.

Club statistics

References

External links

1967 births
Living people
Brazilian footballers
J1 League players
Nagoya Grampus players
Brazilian expatriate footballers
Expatriate footballers in Japan
Association football defenders